A Will and a Way is a 1922 British silent comedy film directed by Manning Haynes and starring Ernest Hendrie, Polly Emery and Johnny Butt.

Cast
 Ernest Hendrie as Foxey Green  
 Polly Emery as Mrs. Pottle  
 Johnny Butt as Joe Chambers  
 Cynthia Murtagh as Fora Pottle  
 Charles Ashton as George Smith  
 Ada Palmer as Eliza Collins  
 Agnes Brantford as Mrs. Waker  
 Peggie Beans as Jenny Pottle  
 Maisie Beans as Lertie Pottle

References

Bibliography
 Goble, Alan. The Complete Index to Literary Sources in Film. Walter de Gruyter, 1999.

External links

1922 films
British silent feature films
British comedy films
Films directed by H. Manning Haynes
British black-and-white films
1922 comedy films
1920s English-language films
1920s British films
Silent comedy films